Gifty Addy (born 19 January 1984 in Accra) is a Ghanaian sprinter who specializes in the 200 metres.

Achievements

Personal bests
100 metres - 11.82 s (2007)
200 metres - 24.18 s (2006)
400 metres - 54.00 s

External links

1984 births
Living people
Ghanaian female sprinters
Athletes (track and field) at the 2006 Commonwealth Games
Sportspeople from Accra
African Games gold medalists for Ghana
African Games medalists in athletics (track and field)
Athletes (track and field) at the 2007 All-Africa Games
Commonwealth Games competitors for Ghana